Class of '44 is a 1973 American coming-of-age comedy-drama film based on the memoirs of screenwriter Herman Raucher. Directed by Paul Bogart, it is structured as a sequel to the 1971 film Summer of '42 which recounted the events in the earlier portion of Raucher's memoirs.

The film is a slice-of-life style autobiography of sorts, depicting Herman Raucher's (Gary Grimes) freshman year in college, where he falls in love with Julie (Deborah Winters) under the shadow of the growing threat of World War II. Jerry Houser and Oliver Conant reprise their roles as Oscar "Oscy" Seltzer and Benjy, the two other members of Raucher's circle of friends, "The Terrible Trio,"  but Conant only makes a very brief appearance.

Plot
Friends Hermie (an aspiring artist), Oscy (a jock), and Benjy (a nerd) graduate high school in the spring of 1944, under the looming threat of World War II. At a post-graduation party, Hermie and Oscy are startled when Benjy tells them that he's enlisted in the Marines. While Hermie and Oscy spend their summer vacation working at a loading dock, Benjy goes to basic training. By the end of summer, Hermie and Oscy see Benjy off on his way to fight in the Pacific Theater.

At their fathers' behest, Oscy and Hermie go to college. Much of the film consists of slice of life vignettes depicting college life during wartime, with the effect of the war on the home front as a constant recurring theme.

While Hermie is serious about his studies, Oscy primarily sees college as an opportunity to pick up girls. On the campus newspaper staff, Hermie meets and falls in love with Julie, a well-to-do coed. At Julie’s suggestion, Hermie and Oscy join a fraternity and manage to successfully pass through the mandatory hazing rituals. Shortly after moving into the frat house, however, Oscy is expelled for bringing a prostitute into his room and Hermie is forced to deal with an annoying roommate. Oscy, soon after leaving and seeing no alternative, decides to enlist in the Army.

Hermie and Julie have a falling out after Julie tells him she intends to go out on a non-romantic date with an old boyfriend coming into town on shore leave. Hermie expresses his distrust of Julie and they break up. Back at the frat house, Hermie receives a phone call from his mother that his father has died unexpectedly. Returning home for the funeral, he's reunited with Oscy, who has passed basic training and is now a clerk typist on Governor's Island. Oscy then takes Hermie out for a night of drinking in his father's memory, culminating in a bar room brawl. Back at Hermie's house, a drunk Hermie voices his inability to accept his father's death before passing out. Oscy stays up through the night, watching over Hermie.

Hermie returns to college and is about to call for a cab at the New York, New Haven and Hartford Railroad train station when Julie arrives in her car. She tells him that Hermie's mother told her about his father's death, and that she's come to reconcile with him. Julie further tells Hermie that she's learned that he has passed his final exams for the semester and has successfully completed his freshman year. Hermie and Julie reconcile and climb into the back seat of Julie's car as the film ends.

Cast

Gary Grimes……….Hermie
Jerry Houser……….Oscy
Oliver Conant……….Benjy
Deborah Winters……….Julie
William Atherton……….Fraternity President
Sam Bottoms……….Marty

Joe Ponazecki……….Professor
Murray Westgate……….Principal
Marion Waldman……….Grade Advisor
Mary Long……….Valedictorian
Marcia Diamond……….Mrs. Gilhuly
Jeffrey Cohen……….Editor
Susan Marcus……….Assistant Editor
Lamar Criss……….1st Proctor
Michael A. Hoey……….2nd Proctor
Dan McDonald……….Father
Jan Campbell……….Mother

Production
The subway scenes were filmed on location in Brooklyn, New York.  A vintage 1920s BMT Triplex train was used and the interior of the 15th Avenue entrance to the New Utrecht Avenue station on the Sea Beach (today's N) line was restored to its 1940s appearance.  The train itself operated on the West End (today's D) line and is seen pulling into the 62nd Street station.

The scene at the diner was filmed in Toronto for the purpose of depicting PCC-type streetcars that ran in Brooklyn during the time period in which the movie is set.  However, the streetcars seen in the movie are postwar models characterized by the presence of standee windows, which prewar PCCs such as the ones that operated in Brooklyn did not have.  They also have the maroon and cream paint scheme used in Toronto, while Brooklyn's PCCs were predominantly tan.

The film is also noted for being the feature film debut of John Candy in a very brief uncredited appearance at the beginning as a high school graduate who interacts with Hermie and Oscy.

Reception
The film received moderate and poor reviews upon its release. Although several venues granted free, or discounted, admission for moviegoers who graduated from high school in 1944, the film did not fare very well at the box office, mostly attributed to the film's breaking the "arty" format of the first film for a more standard approach, and the omission of any mention of the first film. The movie slipped into obscurity, and although Summer of '42 has been on DVD for several years, where it has been a relative commercial success, Warner Brothers released Class of '44 on made-to-order DVD in 2010.

The film was spoofed in the December 1973 issue of Mad magazine as "The Clods of '44."

References

External links

Class of '44 at TV Guide (1987 write-up was originally published in The Motion Picture Guide)

1973 films
1970s coming-of-age comedy-drama films
American coming-of-age comedy-drama films
American sequel films
Films about fraternities and sororities
Films directed by Paul Bogart
Films scored by David Shire
Films set in 1944
Films set in Brooklyn
Films set in Connecticut
Films set in universities and colleges
Films set on the home front during World War II
Films shot in New York City
Films shot in New Jersey
Films shot in Toronto
Films with screenplays by Herman Raucher
Warner Bros. films
1970s English-language films
1970s American films